The 2014–15 Howard Bison men's basketball team represented Howard University during the 2014–15 NCAA Division I men's basketball season. The Bison, led by fifth year head coach Kevin Nickelberry, played their home games at the Burr Gymnasium and were members of the Mid-Eastern Athletic Conference. They finished the season 16–16, 10–6 in MEAC play to finish in fourth place. They lost in the quarterfinals of the MEAC tournament to Delaware State.

Roster

Schedule

|-
!colspan=9 style="background:#FF0000; color:#00008B;"|Regular season

|-
!colspan=9 style="background:#FF0000; color:#00008B;"| MEAC tournament

References

Howard Bison men's basketball seasons
Howard
Howard Bison basketball
Howard Bison basketball